Super TV may refer to:

Television channels
Super TV (American TV channel), a 1980s subscription television service
Super TV (Greek TV channel), a regional TV channel in Macedonia, Greece
Super TV2, a television channel in Hungary
, an Italian regional TV channel
, a Taiwanese TV channel

Television services
Super TV (Bosnia and Herzegovina), an IPTV provider in Bosnia and Herzegovina

Television programs
Super Junior's Super TV, a Korean variety show

Other
, a German weekly publication